Claire Fraser may refer to:

Claire M. Fraser (born 1955), American microbiologist
Claire Fraser (character), a fictional character in the Outlander series of novels
Claire Fraser (cyclist) (born 1985), road cyclist from Guyana